Berton "Bert" Jerome Schneider (May 5, 1933December 12, 2011) was an American film and television producer.

He was responsible for several topical films of the late 1960s and early 1970s, including the road film Easy Rider (1969), directed by Dennis Hopper.

Early life and education
Schneider was born to a wealthy Jewish family in New York City and raised in New Rochelle, New York. His father was Abraham Schneider (1905-1993), who succeeded Harry Cohn as the president of Columbia Pictures. He was the middle of two brothers, the younger Harold and the elder Stanley. Schneider tended toward the rebellious politics of the day. Briefly a student at Cornell University, located in Ithaca, New York, he was ultimately expelled.

His brother, Harold Schneider, also became a film producer.

Career
In 1953, he worked for Screen Gems, Columbia's television division in Los Angeles. In 1965, Schneider formed a partnership with the film director Bob Rafelson, creating Raybert Productions. The duo brought to television The Monkees (1966–1968), a situation comedy about a fictional rock band (who became a real group, The Monkees, to meet public demand, and their own aspirations).

The success of The Monkees allowed Schneider and Rafelson to break into feature films, first with the counterculture film Head (1968), starring The Monkees, directed by Rafelson and featuring a screenplay co-written by Rafelson and Jack Nicholson. The film bombed in its initial release due to poor distribution and the lack of a target audience for 1968. Monkees fans were disappointed that the disjointed, stream-of-consciousness ring of stories was not just an expanded episode.  Art film enthusiasts may have embraced its creativity but were not interested in a film by the "pre-fab four." In recent years, the film has received above average reviews from critics and fans alike as an interesting 1960s period piece.

They had their first major success with Easy Rider (1969), which ushered in the era of New Hollywood.  Then followed with the drama film Five Easy Pieces (1970), which Rafelson directed. Following Five Easy Pieces, Schneider and Rafelson added a partner, Stephen Blauner, and Raybert turned into BBS Productions.

They subsequently made a series of films, including the drama films The Last Picture Show (1971), directed by Peter Bogdanovich and The King of Marvin Gardens (1972), directed by Rafelson. In 1975 he was a member of the jury at the 9th Moscow International Film Festival.

Academy Award controversy
In 1975, Schneider received an Academy Award for Best Documentary Feature for producing Hearts and Minds (1974), a documentary film about the Vietnam War, directed by Peter Davis.  His acceptance speech was one of the most politically controversial in the ceremony's history. Schneider's speech included this statement: "It’s ironic that we’re here at a time just before Vietnam is about to be liberated." He then read a telegram from the head of the North Vietnamese delegation to the Paris peace talks. It thanked the antiwar movement "for all they have done on behalf of peace. Greetings of friendship to all American people."  After receiving thousands of angry telegrams backstage, Frank Sinatra appeared later in the show to read a disclaimer that disavowed Schneider's statement, which in turn provoked angry responses from actors Shirley MacLaine and Warren Beatty. Beatty later berated Sinatra on stage, calling him "you old Republican."

Personal life and death
In 1954, he married his first wife, Judy Feinberg (born 1936), who was also Jewish and from a wealthy family. They had two children: Jeffrey and Audrey. They later divorced and he was subsequently married three more times.

Between 1971 and 1974 Schneider had a relationship with Candice Bergen.  Bergen wrote about their relationship in her first memoir, 'Knock Wood', in which she wrote about their tumultuous relationship, referring to Schneider under the pseudonym "Robin".

In 2011, Schneider died of natural causes, aged 78, in Los Angeles, California. He was survived by his son and daughter.

In popular culture
Peter Fonda based his character Terry Valentine in the crime film The Limey (1999) partly on Schneider, according to Fonda's interview on the film's DVD.

Filmography and television work

See also

List of Cornell University alumni
List of film producers
List of people from Los Angeles
List of people from New York City
List of television producers

References

External links
 
Bert Schneider: Hearts and Minds papers, 1969-2002, University Archives and Special Collections, Joseph P. Healey Library, University of Massachusetts Boston
 FBI Docs Bert Schneider FBI File

1933 births
2011 deaths
Businesspeople from Los Angeles
Businesspeople from New York City
Cornell University alumni
Film producers from California
The Monkees
Television producers from California
Television producers from New York City